Bani Saad Sport Club, is an Iraqi football team based in Diyala, that plays in Iraq Division Three.

Managerial history
 Basil Al Askour
 Kadhim Hussein
 Ramzi Mohsin
 Basil Dawood Al-Saadi

See also 
 2019–20 Iraq FA Cup
 2020–21 Iraq FA Cup
 2021–22 Iraq FA Cup

References

External links
 Bani Saad SC on Goalzz.com
 Iraq Clubs- Foundation Dates

2004 establishments in Iraq
Association football clubs established in 2004
Football clubs in Diyala